Atlantic Osprey is an anchor handling tug supply (AHTS) vessel, launched 17 April 2003.

Built by Halifax Shipyard for operation by Atlantic Towing Limited, Atlantic Osprey is an Ulstein UT722L design intended for use in the offshore oil fields.

In December 2005, she recovered the wreckage of a crashed Canadian Coast Guard helicopter  near Marystown, Newfoundland.

She was the vessel used to recover wreckage and bodies following the 12 March 2009 crash of Cougar Helicopters Flight 91.

References

External links 
 Most current track Marine Traffic

Tugboats of Canada
Ships built in Nova Scotia
2003 ships